Eric Mitchell is a French born writer, director and actor who moved to downtown New York City in the early 1970s. He has acted in many No Wave films such as Permanent Vacation (1980) by Jim Jarmusch, but is best known for his own films that are usually writing and directed by him: Kidnapped, Red Italy, Underground U.S.A. and The Way It Is or Eurydice in the Avenues, starring Steve Buscemi, Vincent Gallo, Mark Boone Junior and Rockets Redglare. Mitchell worked out of New York City's sordid East Village area in conjunction with Colab and other performance artists and noise musicians. There he created a series of scruffy, deeply personal, short Super 8mm and 16mm films in which he combined darkly sinister images to explore the manner in which the individual is constrained by society.

Early life
Mitchell came of age in the French art world, as his father was the longtime companion of painter Françoise Gilot between her marriage to Picasso and her subsequent marriage to Jonas Salk. Mitchell himself began to work, as a teenager, as an assistant photographer on the French magazine Lui, shooting with leading glamour models of the day.

Performance and music
In the mid-1970s, Mitchell mounted several multi-media events at The Kitchen in New York that were documented by Jimmy DeSana. With fellow artist Martin Kippenberger Mitchell put out the punk single Luxus in 1979 according to Roberta Smith of The New York Times .

Acting
Mitchell has acted in Permanent Vacation (1980) by Jim Jarmusch and in Amos Poe's no wave classics Unmade Beds (1976) and The Foreigner (1978), where he plays a young Frenchman in New York that is hotly pursued up and down the busy streets of New York City by thugs. Along the way he encounters a couple of bizarre young women (a new wave songstress delivering a rendition of Bertolt Brecht's Bilbao Song and a sadist). Mitchell also performs in the films J'ai vu tuer Ben Barka (2005) by Serge Le Péron and Saïd Smihi, Minus Zero (1979) by Michael Oblowitz, Men in Orbit (1979) by John Lurie, The Scenic Route (1978) by Mark Rappaport, Candy Mountain (1988) by Robert Frank and in James Nares's no wave film Rome 78 (1978), among others.

Artwork
As a lifelong painter, draughtsman and illustrator, Mitchell had a retrospective exhibition of his work called Call It Nothing in 2006 at Mitchell Algus Gallery in Chelsea, New York and has had his work featured in The New Yorker and in Bergdorf Goodman Magazine.

Film style
During the late 1970s to early 1980s, Mitchell was among the most significant proponents of the punk art bohemian style of No Wave Cinema. This low-budget style of underground punk filmmaking concerned itself with the art theory issues of neo-expressionism and simulation that were then typical of an emerging postmodernism.

Rising from the ashes of a bankrupt and destitute 1970's Manhattan, and reacting to the modernist aesthetic of 1960's avant-garde film, No Wave filmmakers like Mitchell embraced their brand of DIO vanguard moviemaking. Inspired by the films of Jack Smith, Andy Warhol, John Waters and The French New Wave, Mitchell's films combined elements of documentary and loose narrative structure, somewhat like the methods of Jean-Luc Godard, with stark, at times confrontational, visual imagery. Much like the No Wave music of the period (from which the movement garnered its label), Mitchell pillaged the nascent East Village art scene for co-conspirators like Lydia Lunch, James Chance, Debbie Harry, Richard Hell, Vincent Gallo, Steve Buscemi, Nan Goldin, Cookie Mueller and many others. Mitchell's mindset of fast and cheap was catalyzed by these collaborations. Mitchell's influencal stylist neo-nor films were showcased at New Cinema on Astor Place and at punk rock venues like the Mudd Club, CBGB and Tier 3.

Films

Kidnapped

Kidnapped (1978), his first feature, took on political terrorism, recasting it in the form of a group improvisation for jaded, aimless bohemian types. The deadpan acting style the actors indulge in owes much to the work of Rainer Werner Fassbinder and Andy Warhol. Indeed, Kidnapped was inspired by Vinyl (1965), a black-and-white experimental film directed by Warhol at The Factory starring Gerard Malanga, Edie Sedgwick and Ondine - an early adaptation of Anthony Burgess' novel A Clockwork Orange. In Kidnapped, Mitchell, Anya Phillips and Gordon Stevenson hang around a cramped lower east side apartment. Coolly, they talk with each other (often reading directly off the script that has been taped to the wall) and dance and fight with each other as the no wave music of Teenage Jesus and the Jerks plays on the stereo within the movie set. Like in a Warhol film, oftentimes nothing much happens in the plot, until towards the end the players go and kidnap Mudd Club owner Steve Mass and abuse him.

Red Italy

Jaded political satire also figured in Mitchell's next feature, Red Italy (1979). Here the actor-director recreated a parody of the style of Italian films of the '60s, shooting a story of a young disillusioned worker living a bohemian life (played by Mitchell himself) and his glamour-ridden starlet girlfriend (Jennifer Miro). The film is set within Italian movie"-type locations in NYC like espresso bars, Italian restaurants, vacant lots, etc. Mitchell has called the movie "a portrait of a bored, disenchanted woman in post-war Italy." Indeed, boredom becomes one of Mitchell's major themes in Red Italy, an emotional stance that he maintains throughout his films.

Underground U.S.A.

In 1980, Eric Mitchell directed, wrote and starred in one of the most ambitious films of the No Wave movement, Underground U.S.A. (16mm, 85 min). Made for $25,000 (considered by no-wave standards a big budget), written in two days and created in three weeks, Underground U.S.A. featured Patti Astor as Vicky, an aging actress who still thinks of herself as young and attractive and, in her vulnerability, falls for a hustler named Victor (played by Mitchell). Even with cinematography by Tom DiCillo, sound by Jim Jarmusch, editing by  J.P. Roland-Levy and the authentic locations of the Lower East Side art scene, the film was not a huge commercial success, but did succeed in bringing in a whole new audience to No Wave Cinema. It challenged both commercial movie making and the avant-garde with a style that combined amateur enthusiasm with sophisticated visual know-how and a sharp sense of social and political observation diametrically opposite of the staid formalism of the experimental film establishment. But while paying generous tribute to the Warhol era (the cast is filled with Warhol veterans like Jackie Curtis and Taylor Mead) Mitchell's approach is never nostalgic. "No More '60s, No More '70s" reads the actor-director's press release for the film. When the 16mm film was first released in 1980, it ran for six months at Colab sponsored St Mark's Cinema and since has received a Cineprobe screening at MoMA, was broadcast on Independent Focus, Channel 13 and aired on BBC's Channel 4. Soon after, MoMA acquired a brand new print for its collection which was screened in the series "Looking at Music" that was curated by Barbara London. Underground U.S.A. has cameo performances by Cookie Mueller, Jackie Curtis, Taylor Mead, Steve Mass, John Lurie and Duncan Smith.

The Way It Is or Eurydice in the AvenuesThe Way It Is or Eurydice in the Avenues (1985) stars Steve Buscemi, Vincent Gallo, Rockets Redglare and Mark Boone Junior. In this 80 minute film, a group of actors have been rehearsing Jean Cocteau's Orpheus in the East Village. On a warm summer day, the body of Eurydice, the lead actress, is found dead in Tompkins Square Park. At her funeral, the actors, each a suspect, examine their relationships with her in order to unravel the mystery of her demise. The actors' memories, the underworld of Cocteau's play, and the East Village milieu become inextricably linked. The tragedy of Eurydice plays against the end of an era: scorched tenements, the Mudd Club, and punk rock.

Footnotes

References
 Carlo McCormick, The Downtown Book: The New York Art Scene, 1974–1984, Princeton University Press, 2006.
 Alan Moore and Marc Miller, eds. ABC No Rio Dinero: The Story of a Lower East Side Art Gallery New York: ABC No Rio with Collaborative Projects, 1985.
 Masters, Marc. No Wave. London: Black Dog Publishing, 2007. 
 Pearlman, Alison, Unpackaging Art of the 1980s. Chicago: University Of Chicago Press, 2003.
 Reynolds, Simon. "Contort Yourself: No Wave New York." In Rip It Up and Start Again: Post-punk 1978–84. London: Faber and Faber, Ltd., 2005.
 Taylor, Marvin J. (ed.). The Downtown Book: The New York Art Scene, 1974–1984'', foreword by Lynn Gumpert. Princeton: Princeton University Press, 2006.

External links

American film directors
American experimental filmmakers
French experimental filmmakers
Punk filmmakers
Punk films
American art
No wave
Living people
Year of birth missing (living people)